Maryinskaya is a rural locality (a village) in Korobitsynskoye Rural Settlement, Syamzhensky District, Vologda Oblast, Russia. The population was 5 as of 2002.

Geography 
Maryinskaya is located 61 km southeast of Syamzha (the district's administrative centre) by road. Piligino is the nearest rural locality.

References 

Rural localities in Syamzhensky District